Petite Rocks are two small isolated rocks in the west part of Sallee Snowfield, about 5 nautical miles (9 km) east of central Dufek Massif, Pensacola Mountains. Mapped by United States Geological Survey (USGS) from surveys and U.S. Navy air photos, 1956–66. The name applied by Advisory Committee on Antarctic Names (US-ACAN) is descriptive of their small size.

Rock formations of Queen Elizabeth Land